Marcus D'Arcy is an Australian film editor.

He was nominated for the Academy Award for Film Editing in 1995 for his work on Babe, which he shared with Jay Friedkin.

Selected filmography

External links

References

Australian film editors
Living people
Year of birth missing (living people)
Place of birth missing (living people)